Puer may refer to:

Pu'er tea or Pu-erh tea, a variety of fermented tea, named after Pu'er in Yunnan Province
Old Pu'er, present-day Ning'er Hani and Yi Autonomous County, China
Pu'er City, a prefecture-level city in Yunnan, China, formerly known as Simao County 
Puer (geomancy)

See also
Puer aeternus, Latin for eternal boy
Puer mingens, Latin for an artistic depiction of a boy urinating
Puer oblatus, Latin for an oblate who has not yet reached puberty

Puering or bating, a process using dog excrement or 'puer', as a step in the tanning of leather
Puar (disambiguation)